Hit'n'Hide is a Euro-Dance duo from Denmark, going through three members including Jeanne C, Morgan Jalsing and Christina S. They are most famous for their single "Space Invaders".

Discography

Albums

On a Ride (1998)
 "Hit'n'Hide on a Ride"
 "Sundance"
 "Space Invaders"
 "Boomerang"
 "California"
 "Partyman"
 "Doo Run"
 "True Love"
 "World of Dreams"
 "Mr. Melody"
 "Be My Bodyguard"
 "Book of Love" (select versions only)
 "Superashii Hanabi" (Japanese bonus track)

On a Ride Remix Album (1998)
Track list unknown (rare album)

Hit'n'Hide (2000)
 "On Stage Tonight"
 "Come Come Come"
 "Kingdom of Eternity"
 "Run Run"
 "If You Really Want Me"
 "I Don't Wanna Leave"
 "Whisper You're Mine"
 "Stay"
 "Lonely Raider"
 "Guardian Angel"
 "Say Goodnight"
 "Space Invaders" (2000 Remix)

Hit'n'Hide (Limited Edition)
 "On Stage Tonight"
 "Come Come Come"
 "Kingdom of Eternity"
 "Run Run"
 "If You Really Want Me"
 "I Don't Wanna Leave"
 "Whisper You're Mine"
 "Stay"
 "Lonely Raider"
 "Guardian Angel"
 "Say Goodnight"
 "Space Invaders" (2000 Remix)
 "Come Come Come" (Extended Mix)
 "Run Run" (Remix)

Singles

References

External links
  (defunct)
 Hit'n'Hide at The Eurodance Encyclopedia
 Hit'n'Hide biography, news, discography at Bubblegum Dancer

Danish musical groups